Hiraoka Station is the name of two train stations in Japan:

 Hiraoka Station (Nagano) (平岡駅)
 Hiraoka Station (Osaka) (枚岡駅)